Zachary Taylor Shafer (July 13, 1866 – October 27, 1945) was a Major League Baseball player in the 19th century.

Career
Shafer was born in Philadelphia, Pennsylvania, in 1866. He started his professional baseball career in 1884, when he played for the Altoona Mountain City, Kansas City Cowboys, and Baltimore Monumentals of the Union Association. He appeared in 60 games that season, mostly as an outfielder, and had a batting average of .203.

Shafer spent the next five years in the minor leagues. In 1887, he batted a career-high .364 for Oshkosh of the Northwestern League. In 1890, he made it back to the majors with the American Association's Philadelphia Athletics. He was a second baseman for Philadelphia and batted .172 with 21 RBI in 69 games. That was his last season in professional baseball.

Shafer was 5'7" and weighed 155 pounds. He was the brother of fellow baseball player Orator Shafer.

Taylor Shafer died in Glendale, California, in 1945.

References

External links

1866 births
1945 deaths
19th-century baseball players
Major League Baseball second basemen
Major League Baseball right fielders
Altoona Mountain Citys players
Kansas City Cowboys (UA) players
Baltimore Monumentals players
Philadelphia Athletics (AA) players
Haverhill (minor league baseball) players
Minneapolis Millers (baseball) players
Oshkosh (minor league baseball) players
St. Paul Apostles players
Toledo Black Pirates players
Baseball players from Philadelphia